Loon op Zand is a municipality and a village in the southern Netherlands.

The western part of national park the Loonse en Drunense Duinen is located in the municipality of Loon op Zand.

Population centres

Topography

Dutch Topographic map of the municipality of Loon op Zand, June 2015.

Kaatsheuvel 
Kaatsheuvel is the location of the amusement park Efteling.

Loon op Zand 

Loon op Zand is the oldest village of the municipality. Somewhere around the year 1000, this village was founded in a very wet and swampy area. There was also a lot of drift-sand whose origin, according to geological experts, dates back to the last ice age. As of this moment, Loon op Zand has the biggest driftsand area in all of western Europe. The presence of this driftsand explains the name of Loon op Zand. It means Village build on sand. Historically, the presence of this driftsand has caused the relocation of the village on several times. Hinerland farmers build many sandy embankments or levies to protect their land against the ceaseless drifting sand.

For 200 years, Loon op Zand and Kaatsheuvel were the centre of the leather tanning and shoe manufacturing industry of the region. There were a lot of factories; most of these were in people's backyards. There were some big shoe manufacturers like Van Lier. This world-famous shoe brand originated in Loon op Zand. Just prior to the new millennium, Van Lier abandoned their factory in Loon op Zand and moved to a bigger factory in Breda.

Notable people 

 Paul Litjens (born 1947 in Loon op Zand) a former field hockey player
 Ton Masseurs (born 1947 in Kaatsheuvel) a Dutch pedal steel guitar player
 Ben Knapen (born 1951 in Kaatsheuvel) a Dutch politician, the CDA parliamentary leader in the Senate 
 Mark van Loosdrecht (born 1959 in Loon op Zand) an academic and inventor of Nereda, a wastewater treatment technology
 Ilse Broeders (born 1977 in Loon op Zand) a Dutch bobsledder, competed in the 2002 and 2006 Winter Olympics
 Jacqueline Govaert (born 1982 in Kaatsheuvel) a Dutch singer, songwriter, and pianist

Gallery

Notes

References

External links 

 

 
Municipalities of North Brabant
Populated places in North Brabant